The Latvian Mixed Curling Championship is the national championship of mixed curling in Latvia. It has been held annually since 2004. It is organized by the Latvian Curling Association.

List of champions

References

See also
Latvian Men's Curling Championship
Latvian Women's Curling Championship
Latvian Mixed Doubles Curling Championship
Latvian Junior Curling Championships

Curling competitions in Latvia
National curling championships
Recurring sporting events established in 2004
2004 establishments in Latvia
Curling
Mixed curling